Paul Andrew Kerr (born 9 June 1964) is an English former footballer who played as a midfielder. He scored 48 goals in 264 league appearances in a 13-year career in the Football League.

He began his career at Aston Villa in 1982, before moving on to Middlesbrough in January 1987. He helped the club to win promotion into the First Division with successive promotions in 1986–87 and 1988. He also played in the Full Members Cup final in 1990, before he moved on to Millwall in March 1991. He was sold on to Port Vale in July 1992 for a fee of £140,000, and helped the "Valiants" to win the Football League Trophy in 1993 and then to win promotion out of the Second Division in 1993–94. Loaned out to Leicester City in March 1994, he then ended his career at Wycombe Wanderers.

Career
Kerr began his professional career at Aston Villa in May 1982 after two years as an apprentice. Villa recorded a sixth-place finish in the First Division in 1982–83 under Tony Barton's stewardship. Following tenth-place finishes in 1983–84 and 1984–85, Villa dropped to 16th in 1985–86. They were then relegated in 1986–87 under Billy McNeill, though Kerr escaped this fate as he left the club in January. Kerr played 34 league and cup games in his five years with the "Villans", scoring six goals.

He signed with Middlesbrough for a £50,000 fee in January 1987, and helped Bruce Rioch's side to win promotion at the end of the season after a second-place finish in the Third Division. "Boro" missed out on a second-place finish in 1987–88, as they finished behind Kerr's former club Aston Villa on goals scored. He featured in both legs of the Second Division play-off Final victory over Chelsea. However they were immediately relegated in 1988–89, finishing in 18th place, one point behind Villa. They avoided a second successive relegation in 1989–90, finishing one place and two points above the drop. Kerr also managed to get some revenge over Aston Villa by scoring past them in the 1990 Full Members Cup semi-final, which helped Middlesbrough reach Wembley for the first time in the club's history. He was a substitute in the final, as "Boro" lost 1–0 to Chelsea following a first half strike from Tony Dorigo. "Boro" pushed for promotion in 1990–91 under Colin Todd, though Kerr departed Ayresome Park in March having scored 18 goals for Middlesbrough in 162 appearances in all competitions.

In March 1991, he was signed by Bruce Rioch for a second time, who was then in charge at Millwall. The "Lions" went on to finish the season in the play-off places, only to lose to Brighton & Hove Albion at the semi-final stage. He then scored twelve goals in 1991–92 to become the club's top scorer during an otherwise disappointing campaign. Kerr scored a total of 15 goals in 51 league and cup appearances at The Den.

He signed for Port Vale in July 1992, with manager John Rudge paying a fee of £140,000. He scored 15 goals in 51 appearances in 1992–93, including a goal in the Potteries derby defeat at the Victoria Ground on 24 October. His most crucial goal though came in the fourth minute of the Football League Trophy final, when he converted a Bernie Slaven cross to give the "Valiants" the first goal of a 2–1 win over Stockport County at Wembley. He went on to say: "My goal was a great ball from Bernie. I’d found myself in space behind the defence and seeing the gap between the goalkeeper and the right hand post I decided to take the shot then. I knew there was a defender behind me, but I was just delighted to see the ball hit the back of the net." Eight days later he played in the play-off Final defeat to West Bromwich Albion. Promotion to the First Division was finally achieved with a second-place finish in 1993–94, during which Keer struck five times.

Kerr joined Leicester City on loan in March 1994, and scored twice in seven First Division games for Brian Little's "Foxes", before returning to Vale Park at the end of the season. He was released by Port Vale, having scored 20 goals in 84 appearances. He joined Martin O'Neill's Wycombe Wanderers for the 1994–95 campaign, and scored one goal in his only substitute appearance in the league; he also started one cup game for the club.

Post-retirement
Having acted as a financial adviser to the Professional Footballers' Association, his own business in 2002, offering financial advice to professional footballers.

Career statistics
Source:

Honours
Middlesbrough
Football League Third Division second-place promotion: 1986–87
Football League Second Division play-offs: 1988
Full Members Cup runner-up: 1990

Port Vale
Football League Trophy: 1993
Football League Second Division second-place promotion: 1993–94

References

1964 births
Living people
Footballers from Portsmouth
English footballers
Association football midfielders
Aston Villa F.C. players
Middlesbrough F.C. players
Millwall F.C. players
Port Vale F.C. players
Leicester City F.C. players
Wycombe Wanderers F.C. players
English Football League players
Financial advisors